Claudia Ruiz Massieu Salinas,  (born 10 July 1972) is a Mexican lawyer and politician affiliated with the Institutional Revolutionary Party. She served as Secretary of Foreign Affairs following her appointment by President Enrique Peña Nieto in 2015 to which she resigned on 4 January 2017.

Previously, she served as Secretary of Tourism from 2012 to 2015, having as a major achievement taking Mexico from the 15th to the 10th place for international tourist arrivals according to WTO. During President Peña Nietos transition period she was in charge of Human Rights and Transparency Affairs. She has also served two terms as Congresswoman, for the LIX  and LXI Legislatures of the Mexican Congress.

Personal background

Claudia Ruiz Massieu Salinas is the daughter of José Francisco Ruiz Massieu, and niece to former president Carlos Salinas de Gortari. Her father served as governor for the State of Guerrero, as well as secretary general of the national executive committee of the Institutional Revolutionary Party. She is a law graduate from the Universidad Iberoamericana, where she achieved her title with the thesis: "Jose Francisco Ruiz Massieu's Judiciary Theory on Constitutional and Administrative Law".

She holds a master's degree in comparative politics by FLACSO Mexico and is currently a doctorate candidate in public law and philosophy by the University of Madrid, Spain.

Professional career

Public offices 
Ruiz Massieu  served two terms as Congresswoman, for the LIX (2003-2006)  and LXI (2009-2012) Legislatures of the Mexican Congress.

On January 4, 2007 she was appointed as General Coordinator for Planning, Development and Institutional Innovation at the Attorney General´s Office. And as of 2006 she served as Chief of Staff for the Executive Secretariat of the National Security System on the Secretary of Public Security.

During the transition period of President Enrique Peña Nieto as President Elect, she was in charge of Human Rights and Transparency Affairs. After that, on November 30, 2012, President Peña Nieto appointed her as Secretary of Tourism, charge she left on August 21, 2015, when she was named as Secretary of Foreign Affairs, to which she resigned on January 4, 2017.

Academic experience 
At the Universidad Nacional Autonoma de México she worked as research assistant at the Instituto de Investigaciones Jurídicas from 1995 to 1997. Then she integrated to the technical academic team on the International Commerce research unit also at the Instituto de Investigaciones Jurídicas. In 1997 she became a Law professor at Universidad Anahuac Sur.

Electronic and print media 
Regular writer at the newspaper El Universal, as personal opinion writer, but also with the column "México Global", during her time as Secretary of Foreign Affairs.

Elected offices

LIX Legislature (2003–2006) 
During this time she was part of the following Committees:
 President of the Justice and Human Rights Committee
 Secretary of the Governance Committee
 Member of the Mexico City Committee
 Member of the State Reform Special Committee
 Member of the Jurisdictional Committee

LXI Legislatura (2009–2012) 
During this time she was part of the following Committees:
 Secretary of the Governance Committee
 Member of the Treasury Committee
 Member of the Appropriations Committee
 Member of the Budget Analysis Special Committee
 Member of the Center of Studies for Public Finances Committee
 Member of the Mexico-European Union Mixed Committee
 Member of the Mexico-United States of America Mixed Committee

See also
List of foreign ministers in 2015
List of foreign ministers in 2016
List of foreign ministers in 2017

References

External links

|-

1972 births
21st-century Mexican politicians
21st-century Mexican women politicians
Female foreign ministers
Honorary Dames Commander of the Order of the British Empire
Institutional Revolutionary Party politicians
Living people
Mexican women lawyers
Mexican people of French descent
Members of the Chamber of Deputies (Mexico)
Mexican Secretaries of Foreign Affairs
Mexican Secretaries of Tourism
Women members of the Chamber of Deputies (Mexico)
Politicians from Mexico City
Universidad Iberoamericana alumni
Women Secretaries of State of Mexico
Mexican women diplomats
Deputies of the LIX Legislature of Mexico
Deputies of the LXI Legislature of Mexico
20th-century Mexican lawyers